El Empalme Canton is a canton of Ecuador, located in the Guayas Province.  Its capital is the town of El Empalme.  Its population at the 2001 census was 64,789.

Demographics
Ethnic groups as of the Ecuadorian census of 2010:
Mestizo  61.3%
Montubio  26.1%
Afro-Ecuadorian  7.4%
White  4.7%
Indigenous  0.1%
Other  0.3%

References

Cantons of Guayas Province